Saturnight (subtitled Live in Tokyo) is the first live album by Cat Stevens, released only in Japan. Proceeds from the album went to support UNICEF.

Track listing

Side one
"Wild World" – 3:28
"Oh Very Young" – 2:27
"Sitting" – 3:14
"Where Do the Children Play?" – 3:38
"Lady D'Arbanville" – 4:01
"Another Saturday Night" – 2:37

Side two
"Hard Headed Woman" – 3:42
"Peace Train" – 3:27
"Father and Son" – 3:37
"King of Trees" – 3:49
"A Bad Penny" – 3:43
"Bitterblue" – 3:18

All songs written by Cat Stevens, except "Another Saturday Night" (Sam Cooke).

Personnel
Cat Stevens – vocals, acoustic guitar, piano 
Alun Davies – guitar, backing vocals
Larry Steele – guitars, percussion, backing vocals
Jim Cregan – guitar
Jean Roussel – keyboards
Bruce Lynch – bass guitar
Gerry Conway – drums, percussion
Anna Peacock – backing vocals
Suzanne Lynch – backing vocals

References

A&M Records albums
1974 live albums
Cat Stevens live albums